Frank Tate may refer to:

Frank Tate (boxer) (born 1964), American boxer
Frank Tate (musician) (born 1943), American jazz bassist
Frank Tate (educator) (1864–1939), public figure in education in Australia
Frank Tate, founder of the record label 5 Minute Walk
Frank Tate (Emmerdale), fictional character on the British soap opera Emmerdale